Maharaja Chandrakirti Singh (1850 – May 1886) was a Meitei monarch and the Maharaja of Manipur Kingdom. He was the son of Maharaja Gambhir Singh.

Biography
He was born in Imphal, and resided there till the end of his Regime in 1886. Before he became the king, the reign of his father Maharaja Gambhir Singh was succeeded by Raja Narsingh and later on his death by Raja Narshingh's brother Debendra Singh for a short time. Maharaja Gambhir Singh's death on 9 January 1834 paved the way to the throne to Raja Narsingh.

Chandrakirti had ten sons from his six queens and Maharaja Surchandra is the eldest son of the first queen and the other three sons (Pakasana, Kesarjit, Gopalsana) of the first queen, Kulachandra (the second son of the second queen) and Gandhar Singh (another son of the second queen), Tikendrajit Singh (the third son of the third queen), the son of the fourth queen died in his early days, Angousana (the fifth son of the fifth queen) and the Zila Ngamba (the eighth son of the sixth queen).

See also
List of Manipuri kings
Manipur (princely state)

References

Bibliography
Hodson, Thomas Callan.The Meitheis. Harvard University, 1908.

Meitei royalty
Hindu monarchs